Sage Rennie Karam (born March 5, 1995) is an American professional racing driver who competes part-time in the NASCAR Xfinity Series, driving the Nos. 43 and 45 Chevrolet Camaros for Alpha Prime Racing and part-time in the IndyCar Series, driving the No. 24 for Dreyer & Reinbold Racing. He is the 2013 Indy Lights champion.

Racing career

Early career

Karam was born in and grew up in Nazareth, Pennsylvania. He raced go-karts at Oakland Valley Race Park in Cuddebackville, New York in his youth.

After karting, Karam competed in the 2010 season of the U.S. F2000 National Championship for Andretti Autosport. Karam won nine of twelve races and the pole in all but one race and dominated the championship. For winning the championship, as a part of the Road to Indy program and the Mazdaspeed development ladder, Karam won a prize package valued at US$350,000 that allowed him to compete in the Star Mazda Championship in 2011, again with Andretti Autosport. Karam won back-to-back oval races at the Milwaukee Mile and Iowa Speedway and finished fifth in points, winning rookie of the year honors. He returned to the team and series in 2012 and improved to third in points with three race wins.

Indy Lights
In 2013 he moved up the Road to Indy ladder to the Firestone Indy Lights series with Schmidt Peterson Motorsports. Karam won the Indy Lights title that year, becoming the eighth rookie to win the series championship.

Sports cars
Karam was signed by Chip Ganassi Racing to compete in a number of endurance sportscar races in the United SportsCar Championship in 2014. He ran in the 24 Hours of Daytona, driving the No. 01 car alongside Scott Pruett, Memo Rojas and Jamie McMurray, and the 12 Hours of Sebring in the No. 02, next to IndyCar drivers Scott Dixon and Tony Kanaan.

The Daytona 24 Hours was a short race for Sage, as they suffered engine troubles and dropped out early.

Taking over in hour four, Karam made his 12 Hours of Sebring debut a memorable one by taking the No. 02 car from third place to the lead in his opening lap then extending his lead through the end of his driving stint.  Karam took the wheel for his second stint with the car in fourth place and proceeded to drive to the lead again before handing off to Dixon, who was then knocked off course of a back-marker, leaving them in sixth place at race end.

Back in the 01 car for Watkins Glen, teamed with Scott Pruett and Memo Rojas, things went awry quickly for the trio as first Rojas was sent hard into the wall by a slower GT car.  They returned to the race several laps down, only for Pruett to suffer similar consequences when knocked into the wall by a sports prototype.

With Rojas sidelined due to nagging back injuries, Karam started for his final appearance of the season at the Brickyard Grand Prix, teamed with Pruett in the 01 car. Starting sixth, he skillfully dodged a major melee as several cars came together at the start.  The 01 team remained among the leaders and lead 11 laps before collecting a second place, podium finish.

During 2016, Karam worked as a test driver of 3GT Racing's Lexus RC F GT3. He competed at the 2017 IMSA WeatherTech SportsCar Championship for the factory-supported team, where his best class finish was fifth at Mosport Park.

IndyCar

Ganassi secured Karam a seat in the 2014 Indianapolis 500 with Dreyer & Reinbold Racing, which had not run an IndyCar race since the previous "500". Karam qualified 31st but drove an outstanding race to finish ninth, the second-highest-finishing rookie.

During the 2015 IndyCar Series season Karam split the driving duties for the Chip Ganassi Racing No. 8 Dallara with Sebastián Saavedra, who ran four races on a limited budget. While his season started slowly, by finishing in the lower third of the field in his first three road/street courses events of the season, he proved to be a quick study on the ovals. At Indianapolis, he was at the top of the speed charts on the opening day of practice and consistently remained among the top cars in successive sessions.  After qualifying 23rd, with a conservative setup, he was on top of the speed charts again during the post-qualifying practice and 7th quickest during Carb Day. Considered to be a dark-horse favorite on race day, it was all for naught as he was forced to settle with a 32nd-place finish in the 2015 Indianapolis 500, after contact with Takuma Sato. At the next race, which was at Detroit, in a heavy downpour, Karam was on pole with 90 seconds left in qualifying when IndyCar canceled the session due to track conditions. Following his 3rd place qualifying effort and leading 5 laps on his way to a 5th place finish at Fontana, Karam captured his season-best finish at the 2015 Iowa Corn 300 at Iowa Speedway in July, by finishing 3rd.

In his Pennsylvania homecoming at Pocono Raceway for the 2015 ABC Supply 500 on August 23, Karam was leading with 21 laps remaining when he lost control exiting turn 1, eliminating his Chip Ganassi number 8 Dallara as it spun and crashed hard into the wall. Debris strewn from Karam's disintegrating car made contact with fellow competitor Justin Wilson's helmet, sending him into the infield wall where the safety team extracted him unconscious and unresponsive, necessitating an emergency medevac to Lehigh Valley Hospital–Cedar Crest in Allentown where Wilson lay comatose, in critical condition. Wilson succumbed to his injuries on August 24, 2015.

With Saavedra back in the car for the 2015 season finale at Sonoma, Karam finished the 2015 IndyCar season 20th in points, bested by rival Gabby Chaves for 2015 rookie of the year honors. Replaced for the 2016 season, Karam's seat in the Chip Ganassi stable piloting the number 8 Dallara was secured by Max Chilton.

On a one-race agreement for 2016, Dreyer & Reinbold signed Karam for the Indianapolis 500, initially with Havoline and Gas Monkey Garage as sponsors. Steadily improving from his 23rd qualifying slot on grid, into the top 10, Karam crashed on lap 94, going into Townsend Bell in Turn One.

On a successive one-race agreement, again Dreyer & Reinbold signed Karam to drive the Mecum Auctions No. 24 Dallara-Chevrolet for the 2017 Indianapolis 500. Having improved from his 21st qualifying slot into the top 10, Karam retired his Mecum Auctions Dreyer & Reinbold entry at the 275-mile juncture, with a dead battery. He joined the team again in 2018, sponsored by Wix, but crashed the car on lap 154.

In 2019, he again drove for Dreyer & Reinbold in the 2019 Indianapolis 500. He started 31st and finished 19th. It was announced on July 2, 2019 that Karam would drive for Carlin in the Honda Indy Toronto.

On January 7, 2020, Dreyer & Reinbold Racing announced that they would be expanding their race schedule to at least four races with Karam driving them. These races include the Firestone Grand Prix of St. Petersburg, GMR Grand Prix, 2020 Indianapolis 500, and Honda Indy Toronto. A pit error in the Indy 500 took the team out of contention.

On May 23, 2021, Karam joined Will Power of Australia and Simona de Silvestro of Switzerland as the final three drivers to qualify in the 11th and last row for the 105th running of the Indy 500. He earned the seventh position, his best Indy 500 finish ever.

Rallycross
Karam was signed by Dreyer & Reinbold Racing on a five-race contract for the 2019 Americas Rallycross Championship season. He performed well, never finishing lower than second and earned a win at Mid-Ohio Sports Car Course. In 2021, he returned to rallycross with Dreyer & Reinbold Racing to compete in Nitro Rallycross. He finished second in the championship standings, earning five wins and seven podiums.

NASCAR
On July 26, 2021, it was announced that Karam would make his NASCAR debut in the No. 31 for Jordan Anderson Racing in the Xfinity Series' Pennzoil 150 at the Indianapolis Motor Speedway road course. His schedule with JAR was eventually expanded to include the Xfinity races at Bristol Motor Speedway and the Charlotte Motor Speedway Roval, as well as the Camping World Truck Series event at Martinsville Speedway.

Karam signed with Alpha Prime Racing for a part-time Xfinity schedule in 2022. At Road America, Karam had an on-road scuffle with Noah Gragson, resulting in Gragson intentionally spinning out Karam and triggering a 13-car pileup on lap 25. Gragson was fined 35,000 and docked 30 driver and owner points for the incident.

Personal life
Karam lives in Easton, Pennsylvania with his wife Abigail Guman and three dogs. The two were married on July 16, 2021. He has a younger sister, Sydnee Karam, a swimmer. He graduated from Nazareth Area High School in 2014.

Racing record

American open–wheel racing results
(key)

U.S. F2000 National Championship

Star Mazda Championship

Indy Lights

IndyCar Series
(key)

* Season still in progress.

 ** Podium (non-win) indicates 2nd or 3rd-place finishes.
 *** Top 10s (non-podium) indicates 4th through 10th-place finishes.

Indianapolis 500

Complete WeatherTech SportsCar Championship results
(key)(Races in bold indicate pole position, Results are overall/class)

American rallycross racing results

Complete Americas Rallycross results
(key)

Complete Nitro Rallycross results

NASCAR
(key) (Bold – Pole position awarded by qualifying time. Italics – Pole position earned by points standings or practice time. * – Most laps led.)

Xfinity Series

Camping World Truck Series

 Season still in progress
 Ineligible for series points

References

External links
 
 
 

1995 births
Living people
People from Nazareth, Pennsylvania
Racing drivers from Pennsylvania
American people of Lebanese descent
Indy Pro 2000 Championship drivers
24 Hours of Daytona drivers
WeatherTech SportsCar Championship drivers
Indy Lights champions
Indy Lights drivers
IndyCar Series drivers
Indianapolis 500 drivers
U.S. F2000 National Championship drivers
Sportspeople from Northampton County, Pennsylvania
Nazareth Area High School alumni
NASCAR drivers
Sportspeople of Lebanese descent
Andretti Autosport drivers
Arrow McLaren SP drivers
Dreyer & Reinbold Racing drivers
Chip Ganassi Racing drivers
Carlin racing drivers